Douglas MacArthur (26 January 18805 April 1964) was an American military leader who served as General of the Army for the United States, as well as a field marshal to the Philippine Army. He had served with distinction in World War I, was Chief of Staff of the United States Army during the 1930s, and he played a prominent role in the Pacific theater during World War II. MacArthur was nominated for the Medal of Honor three times, and  received it for his service in the Philippines campaign. This made him along with his father Arthur MacArthur Jr. the first father and son to be awarded the medal. He was one of only five men to rise to the rank of General of the Army in the U.S. Army, and the only one conferred the rank of field marshal in the Philippine Army.

Raised in a military family in the American Old West, MacArthur was valedictorian at the West Texas Military Academy where he finished high school, and First Captain at the United States Military Academy at West Point, where he graduated top of the class of 1903. During the 1914 United States occupation of Veracruz, he conducted a reconnaissance mission, for which he was nominated for the Medal of Honor. In 1917, he was promoted from major to colonel and became chief of staff of the 42nd (Rainbow) Division. In the fighting on the Western Front during World War I, he rose to the rank of brigadier general, was again nominated for a Medal of Honor, and was awarded the Distinguished Service Cross twice and the Silver Star seven times.

From 1919 to 1922, MacArthur served as Superintendent of the U.S. Military Academy at West Point, where he attempted a series of reforms. His next assignment was in the Philippines, where in 1924 he was instrumental in quelling the Philippine Scout Mutiny. In 1925, he became the Army's youngest major general. He served on the court-martial of Brigadier General Billy Mitchell and was president of the American Olympic Committee during the 1928 Summer Olympics in Amsterdam. In 1930, he became Chief of Staff of the United States Army. As such, he was involved in the expulsion of the Bonus Army protesters from Washington, D.C., in 1932, and the establishment and organization of the Civilian Conservation Corps. In 1935 he became Military Advisor to the Commonwealth Government of the Philippines. He retired from the U.S. Army in 1937 and continued being the chief military advisor to the Philippines.

MacArthur was recalled to active duty in 1941 as commander of United States Army Forces in the Far East. A series of disasters followed, starting with the destruction of his air forces on 8 December 1941 and the Japanese invasion of the Philippines. MacArthur's forces were soon compelled to withdraw to Bataan, where they held out until May 1942. In March 1942, MacArthur, his family and his staff left nearby Corregidor Island in PT boats and escaped to Australia, where MacArthur became supreme commander, Southwest Pacific Area. Upon his arrival, MacArthur gave a speech in which he promised "I shall return" to the Philippines. After more than two years of fighting, he fulfilled that promise. For his defense of the Philippines, MacArthur was awarded the Medal of Honor. As the effective ruler of Japan, he oversaw sweeping economic, political and social changes. He led the United Nations Command in the Korean War with initial success; however, the invasion of North Korea provoked the Chinese, causing a series of major defeats. MacArthur was contentiously removed from command by President Harry S. Truman on 11 April 1951. He later became chairman of the board of Remington Rand. He died in Washington, D.C., on 5 April 1964 at the age of 84.

Early life and education
A military brat, Douglas MacArthur was born 26 January 1880, at Little Rock Barracks, Arkansas, to Arthur MacArthur Jr., a U.S. Army captain, and his wife, Mary Pinkney Hardy MacArthur (nicknamed "Pinky"). Arthur Jr. was a son of Scottish-born jurist and politician Arthur MacArthur Sr. Arthur Jr. would later receive the Medal of Honor for his actions with the Union Army in the Battle of Missionary Ridge during the American Civil War, and be promoted to the rank of lieutenant general. Pinkney came from a prominent Norfolk, Virginia, family. Two of her brothers had fought for the South in the Civil War, and refused to attend her wedding. Of the extended family, MacArthur is also distantly related to Matthew Perry, a Commodore of the U.S. Navy. Arthur and Pinky had three sons, of whom Douglas was the youngest, following Arthur III, born on 1 August 1876, and Malcolm, born on 17 October 1878. The family lived on a succession of Army posts in the American Old West. Conditions were primitive, and Malcolm died of measles in 1883. In his memoir, Reminiscences, MacArthur wrote "I learned to ride and shoot even before I could read or write—indeed, almost before I could walk and talk." Douglas was extremely close with his mother and often considered a "mama's boy." Until around the age of 8, she dressed him in skirts and kept his hair long and in curls.

MacArthur's time on the frontier ended in July 1889 when the family moved to Washington, D.C., where he attended the Force Public School. His father was posted to San Antonio, Texas, in September 1893. While there MacArthur attended the West Texas Military Academy, where he was awarded the gold medal for "scholarship and deportment". He also participated on the school tennis team and played quarterback on the school football team and shortstop on its baseball team. He was named valedictorian, with a final year average of 97.33 out of 100. MacArthur's father and grandfather unsuccessfully sought to secure Douglas a presidential appointment to the United States Military Academy at West Point, first from President Grover Cleveland and then from President William McKinley; both were rejected. He later passed the examination for an appointment from Congressman Theobald Otjen, scoring 93.3 on the test. He later wrote: "It was a lesson I never forgot. Preparedness is the key to success and victory."

MacArthur entered West Point on 13 June 1899, and his mother also moved there, to a suite at Craney's Hotel, which overlooked the grounds of the academy. Hazing was widespread at West Point at this time, and MacArthur and his classmate Ulysses S. Grant III were singled out for special attention by Southern cadets as sons of generals with mothers living at Craney's. When Cadet Oscar Booz left West Point after being hazed and subsequently died of tuberculosis, there was a congressional inquiry. MacArthur was called to appear before a special Congressional committee in 1901, where he testified against cadets implicated in hazing, but downplayed his own hazing even though the other cadets gave the full story to the committee. Congress subsequently outlawed acts "of a harassing, tyrannical, abusive, shameful, insulting or humiliating nature", although hazing continued. MacArthur was a corporal in Company B in his second year, a first sergeant in Company A in his third year and First Captain in his final year. He played left field for the baseball team and academically earned 2424.12 merits out of a possible 2470.00 or 98.14%, which was the third-highest score ever recorded. He graduated first in his 93-man class on 11 June 1903. At the time it was customary for the top-ranking cadets to be commissioned into the United States Army Corps of Engineers, therefore, MacArthur was commissioned as a second lieutenant in that corps.

Junior officer
MacArthur spent his graduation furlough with his parents at Fort Mason, California, where his father, now a major general, was serving as commander of the Department of the Pacific. Afterward, he joined the 3rd Engineer Battalion, which departed for the Philippines in October 1903. MacArthur was sent to Iloilo, where he supervised the construction of a wharf at Camp Jossman. He went on to conduct surveys at Tacloban City, Calbayog and Cebu City. In November 1903, while working on Guimaras, he was ambushed by a pair of Filipino brigands or guerrillas; he shot and killed both with his pistol. He was promoted to first lieutenant in Manila in April 1904. In October 1904, his tour of duty was cut short when he contracted malaria and dhobi itch during a survey on Bataan. He returned to San Francisco, where he was assigned to the California Debris Commission. In July 1905, he became chief engineer of the Division of the Pacific.

In October 1905, MacArthur received orders to proceed to Tokyo for appointment as aide-de-camp to his father. A man who knew the MacArthurs at this time wrote that: "Arthur MacArthur was the most flamboyantly egotistical man I had ever seen, until I met his son." They inspected Japanese military bases at Nagasaki, Kobe and Kyoto, then headed to India via Shanghai, Hong Kong, Java and Singapore, reaching Calcutta in January 1906. In India, they visited Madras, Tuticorin, Quetta, Karachi, the Northwest Frontier and the Khyber Pass. They then sailed to China via Bangkok and Saigon, and toured Canton (Guangzhou), Qingdao, Beijing, Tianjin, Hankou and Shanghai before returning to Japan in June. The next month they returned to the United States, where Arthur MacArthur resumed his duties at Fort Mason, still with Douglas as his aide. In September, Douglas received orders to report to the 2nd Engineer Battalion at the Washington Barracks and enroll in the Engineer School. While there he also served as "an aide to assist at White House functions" at the request of President Theodore Roosevelt.

In August 1907, MacArthur was sent to the engineer district office in Milwaukee, where his parents were living. In April 1908, he was posted to Fort Leavenworth, where he was given his first command, Company K, 3rd Engineer Battalion. He became battalion adjutant in 1909 and then engineer officer at Fort Leavenworth in 1910. MacArthur was promoted to captain in February 1911 and was appointed as head of the Military Engineering Department and the Field Engineer School. He participated in exercises at San Antonio, Texas, with the Maneuver Division in 1911 and served in Panama on detached duty in January and February 1912. The sudden death of their father on 5 September 1912 brought Douglas and his brother Arthur back to Milwaukee to care for their mother, whose health had deteriorated. MacArthur requested a transfer to Washington, D.C., so his mother could be near Johns Hopkins Hospital. Army Chief of Staff, Major General Leonard Wood, took up the matter with Secretary of War Henry L. Stimson, who arranged for MacArthur to be posted to the Office of the Chief of Staff in 1912.

Veracruz expedition
On 21 April 1914, President Woodrow Wilson ordered the occupation of Veracruz. MacArthur joined the headquarters staff that was sent to the area, arriving on 1 May 1914. He realized that the logistic support of an advance from Veracruz would require the use of the railroad. Finding plenty of railroad cars in Veracruz but no locomotives, MacArthur set out to verify a report that there were a number of locomotives in Alvarado, Veracruz. For $150 in gold, he acquired a handcar and the services of three Mexicans, whom he disarmed. MacArthur and his party located five engines in Alvarado, two of which were only switchers, but the other three locomotives were exactly what was required. On the way back to Veracruz, his party was set upon by five armed men. The party made a run for it and outdistanced all but two of the armed men, whom MacArthur shot. Soon after, they were attacked by a group of about fifteen horsemen. MacArthur took three bullets in his clothes but was unharmed. One of his companions was lightly wounded before the horsemen decided to retire after MacArthur shot four of them. Further on, the party was attacked a third time by three mounted men. MacArthur received another bullet hole in his shirt, but his men, using their handcar, managed to outrun all but one of their attackers. MacArthur shot both that man and his horse, and the party had to remove the horse's carcass from the track before proceeding.

A fellow officer wrote to Wood recommending that MacArthur's name be put forward for the Medal of Honor. Wood did so, and Chief of Staff Hugh L. Scott convened a board to consider the award. The board questioned "the advisability of this enterprise having been undertaken without the knowledge of the commanding general on the ground". This was Brigadier General Frederick Funston, a Medal of Honor recipient himself, who considered awarding the medal to MacArthur "entirely appropriate and justifiable". However the board feared that "to bestow the award recommended might encourage any other staff officer, under similar conditions, to ignore the local commander, possibly interfering with the latter's plans"; consequently, MacArthur received no award at all.

World War I

Rainbow Division

MacArthur returned to the War Department, where he was promoted to major on 11 December 1915. In June 1916, he was assigned as head of the Bureau of Information at the office of the Secretary of War, Newton D. Baker. MacArthur has since been regarded as the Army's first press officer. Following the declaration of war on Germany on 6 April 1917 and the subsequent American entry into World War I, Baker and MacArthur secured an agreement from President Wilson for the use of the National Guard on the Western Front. MacArthur suggested sending first a division organized from units of different states, so as to avoid the appearance of favoritism toward any particular state. Baker approved the creation of this formation, which became the 42nd ("Rainbow") Division, and appointed Major General William A. Mann, the head of the National Guard Bureau, as its commander; MacArthur was its chief of staff, with the rank of colonel. At MacArthur's request, this commission was in the infantry rather than the engineers.

The 42nd Division was assembled in August and September 1917 at Camp Mills, New York, where its training emphasized open-field combat rather than trench warfare. It sailed in a convoy from Hoboken, New Jersey, for France on 18 October 1917. On 19 December, Mann was replaced as division commander by Major General Charles T. Menoher.

Lunéville-Baccarat Defensive Sector

The 42nd Division entered the line in the quiet Lunéville sector in February 1918. On 26 February, MacArthur and Captain Thomas T. Handy accompanied a French trench raid in which MacArthur assisted in the capture of a number of German prisoners. The commander of the French VII Corps, Major General Georges de Bazelaire, decorated MacArthur with the Croix de Guerre. Menoher recommended MacArthur for a Silver Star, which he later received. The Silver Star Medal was not instituted until 8 August 1932, but small Silver Citation Stars were authorized to be worn on the campaign ribbons of those cited in orders for gallantry, similar to the British mention in despatches. When the Silver Star Medal was instituted, it was retroactively awarded to those who had been awarded Silver Citation Stars. On 9 March, the 42nd Division launched three raids of its own on German trenches in the Salient du Feys. MacArthur accompanied a company of the 168th Infantry. This time, his leadership was rewarded with the Distinguished Service Cross. A few days later, MacArthur, who was strict about his men carrying their gas masks but often neglected to bring his own, was gassed. He recovered in time to show Secretary Baker around the area on 19 March.

Champagne-Marne Offensive
 
MacArthur was promoted to brigadier general on 26 June. In late June, the 42nd Division was shifted to Châlons-en-Champagne to oppose the impending German Champagne-Marne Offensive. Général d'Armée Henri Gouraud of the French Fourth Army elected to meet the attack with a defense in depth, holding the front line area as thinly as possible and meeting the German attack on his second line of defense. His plan succeeded, and MacArthur was awarded a second Silver Star. The 42nd Division participated in the subsequent Allied counter-offensive, and MacArthur was awarded a third Silver Star on 29 July. Two days later, Menoher relieved Brigadier General Robert A. Brown of the 84th Infantry Brigade of his command, and replaced him with MacArthur. Hearing reports that the enemy had withdrawn, MacArthur went forward on 2 August to see for himself. He later wrote: 

MacArthur reported back to Menoher and Lieutenant General Hunter Liggett, the commander of I Corps, that the Germans had indeed withdrawn, and was awarded a fourth Silver Star. He was also awarded a second Croix de guerre and made a commandeur of the Légion d'honneur. MacArthur's leadership during the Champagne-Marne Offensive and Counter-offensive campaigns was noted by General Gouraud when he said MacArthur was "one of the finest and bravest officers I have ever served with."

Battle of Saint-Mihiel and Meuse-Argonne Offensive
The 42nd Division earned a few weeks rest, returning to the line for the Battle of Saint-Mihiel on 12 September 1918. The Allied advance proceeded rapidly and MacArthur was awarded a fifth Silver Star for his leadership of the 84th Infantry Brigade. In his later life he still recalled something peculiar:

He received a sixth Silver Star for his participation in a raid on the night of 25–26 September. The 42nd Division was relieved on the night of 30 September and moved to the Argonne sector where it relieved the 1st Division on the night of 11 October. On a reconnaissance the next day, MacArthur was gassed again, earning a second Wound Chevron.

The 42nd Division's participation in the Meuse–Argonne offensive began on 14 October when it attacked with both brigades. That evening, a conference was called to discuss the attack, during which Major General Charles P. Summerall, commander of V Corps, telephoned and demanded that Châtillon be taken by 18:00 the next evening. An aerial photograph had been obtained that showed a gap in the German barbed wire to the northeast of Châtillon. Lieutenant Colonel Walter E. Bare—the commander of the 167th Infantry—proposed an attack from that direction, where the defenses seemed least imposing, covered by a machine-gun barrage. MacArthur adopted this plan. He was wounded, but not severely, while verifying the existence of the gap in the barbed wire. As he mentioned to William Addleman Ganoe a few years later while superintendent at West Point, MacArthur personally led a reconnaissance patrol of soldiers into no man's land at night to confirm the gap that Bare mentioned to him earlier. The Germans saw them and shot at MacArthur and the squad with artillery and machine guns. MacArthur was the sole survivor of the patrol, claiming it was a miracle that he survived. He confirmed that there was indeed a huge exposed gap in that area due to the lack of enemy gunfire coming from that area.

Summerall nominated MacArthur for the Medal of Honor and promotion to major general, but he received neither. Instead he was awarded a second Distinguished Service Cross. The 42nd Division returned to the line for the last time on the night of 4–5 November 1918. In the final advance on Sedan. MacArthur later wrote that this operation "narrowly missed being one of the great tragedies of American history". An order to disregard unit boundaries led to units crossing into each other's zones. In the resulting chaos, MacArthur was taken prisoner by men of the 1st Division, who mistook him for a German general. This would be soon resolved by the removal of his hat and long scarf that he wore. His performance in the attack on the Meuse heights led to his being awarded a seventh Silver Star. On 10 November, a day before the armistice with Germany that ended the fighting, MacArthur was appointed commander of the 42nd Division. For his service as chief of staff and commander of the 84th Infantry Brigade, he was awarded the Army Distinguished Service Medal.

His period in command was brief, for on 22 November he, like other brigadier generals, was replaced and returned to the 84th Infantry Brigade. The 42nd Division was chosen to participate in the occupation of the Rhineland, occupying the Ahrweiler district. In April 1919, the 42nd Division entrained for Brest and Saint-Nazaire, where they boarded ships to return to the United States. MacArthur traveled on the ocean liner , which reached New York on 25 April 1919.

Between the wars

Superintendent of the United States Military Academy

In 1919, MacArthur became Superintendent of the U.S. Military Academy at West Point, which Chief of Staff Peyton March felt had become out of date in many respects and was much in need of reform. Accepting the post allowed MacArthur to retain his rank of brigadier general, instead of being reduced to his substantive rank of major like many of his contemporaries. When MacArthur moved into the superintendent's house with his mother in June 1919, he became the youngest superintendent since Sylvanus Thayer in 1817. However, whereas Thayer had faced opposition from outside the Army, MacArthur had to overcome resistance from graduates and the academic board.
MacArthur's vision of what was required of an officer came not just from his recent experience of combat in France but also from that of the occupation of the Rhineland in Germany. The military government of the Rhineland had required the Army to deal with political, economic and social problems but he had found that many West Point graduates had little or no knowledge of fields outside of the military sciences. During the war, West Point had been reduced to an officer candidate school, with five classes graduated in two years. Cadet and staff morale was low and hazing "at an all-time peak of viciousness". MacArthur's first change turned out to be the easiest. Congress had set the length of the course at three years. MacArthur was able to get the four-year course restored.

During the debate over the length of the course, The New York Times brought up the issue of the cloistered and undemocratic nature of student life at West Point. Also, starting with Harvard University in 1869, civilian universities had begun grading students on academic performance alone, but West Point had retained the old "whole man" concept of education. MacArthur sought to modernize the system, expanding the concept of military character to include bearing, leadership, efficiency and athletic performance. He formalized the hitherto unwritten Cadet Honor Code in 1922 when he formed the Cadet Honor Committee to review alleged code violations. Elected by the cadets themselves, it had no authority to punish, but acted as a kind of grand jury, reporting offenses to the commandant. MacArthur attempted to end hazing by using officers rather than upperclassmen to train the plebes.

Instead of the traditional summer camp at Fort Clinton, MacArthur had the cadets trained to use modern weapons by regular army sergeants at Fort Dix; they then marched back to West Point with full packs. He attempted to modernize the curriculum by adding liberal arts, government and economics courses, but encountered strong resistance from the academic board. In Military Art classes, the study of the campaigns of the American Civil War was replaced with the study of those of World War I. In History class, more emphasis was placed on the Far East. MacArthur expanded the sports program, increasing the number of intramural sports and requiring all cadets to participate. He allowed upper class cadets to leave the reservation, and sanctioned a cadet newspaper, The Brag, forerunner of today's West Pointer. He also permitted cadets to travel to watch their football team play, and gave them a monthly allowance of $5. Professors and alumni alike protested these radical moves. Most of MacArthur's West Point reforms were soon discarded but, in the ensuing years, his ideas became accepted and his innovations were gradually restored.

Army's youngest major general
MacArthur became romantically involved with socialite and multi-millionaire heiress Louise Cromwell Brooks. They were married at her family's villa in Palm Beach, Florida, on 14 February 1922.

Rumors circulated that General Pershing, who had also courted Louise, had threatened to exile them to the Philippines if they were married. Pershing denied this as "all damn poppycock". More recently, Richard B. Frank has written that Pershing and Brooks had already "severed" their relationship by the time of MacArthur's transfer; Brooks was, however, "informal[ly]" engaged to a close aide of Pershing's (she broke off the relationship in order to accept MacArthur's proposal). Pershing's letter concerning MacArthur's transfer predated—by a few days—Brooks's and MacArthur's engagement announcement, though this did not dispel the newspaper gossip.

In October 1922, MacArthur left West Point and sailed to the Philippines with Louise and her two children, Walter and Louise, to assume command of the Military District of Manila. MacArthur was fond of the children, and spent much of his free time with them.

The revolts in the Philippines had been suppressed, the islands were peaceful now, and in the wake of the Washington Naval Treaty, the garrison was being reduced. MacArthur's friendships with Filipinos like Manuel Quezon offended some people. "The old idea of colonial exploitation", he later conceded, "still had its vigorous supporters." In February and March 1923 MacArthur returned to Washington to see his mother, who was ill from a heart ailment. She recovered, but it was the last time he saw his brother Arthur, who died suddenly from appendicitis in December 1923. In June 1923, MacArthur assumed command of the 23rd Infantry Brigade of the Philippine Division. On 7 July 1924, he was informed that a mutiny had broken out amongst the Philippine Scouts over grievances concerning pay and allowances. Over 200 were arrested and there were fears of an insurrection. MacArthur was able to calm the situation, but his subsequent efforts to improve the salaries of Filipino troops were frustrated by financial stringency and racial prejudice. On 17 January 1925, at the age of 44, he was promoted, becoming the Army's youngest major general.

Returning to the U.S., MacArthur took command of the IV Corps Area, based at Fort McPherson in Atlanta, Georgia, on 2 May 1925. However, he encountered southern prejudice because he was the son of a Union Army officer, and requested to be relieved. A few months later, he assumed command of the III Corps area, based at Fort McHenry in Baltimore, Maryland, which allowed MacArthur and Louise to move to her Rainbow Hill estate near Garrison, Maryland. However, this relocation also led to what he later described as "one of the most distasteful orders I ever received": a direction to serve on the court-martial of Brigadier General Billy Mitchell. MacArthur was the youngest of the thirteen judges, none of whom had aviation experience. Three of them, including Summerall, the president of the court, were removed when defense challenges revealed bias against Mitchell. Despite MacArthur's claim that he had voted to acquit, Mitchell was found guilty as charged and convicted. MacArthur felt "that a senior officer should not be silenced for being at variance with his superiors in rank and with accepted doctrine".

In 1927, MacArthur and Louise separated, and she moved to New York City, adopting as her residence the entire twenty-sixth floor of a Manhattan hotel. In August that year, William C. Prout—the president of the American Olympic Committee—died suddenly and the committee elected MacArthur as their new president. His main task was to prepare the U.S. team for the 1928 Summer Olympics in Amsterdam, where the Americans were successful. Upon returning to the U.S., MacArthur received orders to assume command of the Philippine Department. This time, the general travelled alone. On 17 June 1929, while he was in Manila, Louise obtained a divorce, ostensibly on the grounds of "failure to provide". In view of Louise's great wealth, William Manchester described this legal fiction as "preposterous". Both later acknowledged the real reason to be "incompatibility".

Chief of Staff

By 1930, MacArthur was 50 and still the youngest and one of the best known of the U.S. Army's major generals. He left the Philippines on 19 September 1930 and for a brief time was in command of the IX Corps Area in San Francisco. On 21 November, he was sworn in as Chief of Staff of the United States Army, with the rank of general. While in Washington, he would ride home each day to have lunch with his mother. At his desk, he would wear a Japanese ceremonial kimono, cool himself with an oriental fan, and smoke cigarettes in a jeweled cigarette holder. In the evenings, he liked to read military history books. About this time, he began referring to himself as "MacArthur". He had already hired a public relations staff to promote his image with the American public, together with a set of ideas he was known to favor, namely: a belief that America needed a strongman leader to deal with the possibility that Communists might lead all of the great masses of unemployed into a revolution; that America's destiny was in the Asia-Pacific region; and a strong hostility to the British Empire. One contemporary described MacArthur as the greatest actor to ever serve as a U.S. Army general while another wrote that MacArthur had a court rather than a staff.

The onset of the Great Depression prompted Congress to make cuts in the Army's personnel and budget. Some 53 bases were closed, but MacArthur managed to prevent attempts to reduce the number of regular officers from 12,000 to 10,000. MacArthur's main programs included the development of new mobilization plans. He grouped the nine corps areas together under four armies, which were charged with responsibility for training and frontier defense. He also negotiated the MacArthur-Pratt agreement with the Chief of Naval Operations, Admiral William V. Pratt. This was the first of a series of inter-service agreements over the following decades that defined the responsibilities of the different services with respect to aviation. This agreement placed coastal air defense under the Army. In March 1935, MacArthur activated a centralized air command, General Headquarters Air Force, under Major General Frank M. Andrews.

One of MacArthur's most controversial acts came in 1932, when the "Bonus Army" of veterans converged on Washington. He sent tents and camp equipment to the demonstrators, along with mobile kitchens, until an outburst in Congress caused the kitchens to be withdrawn. MacArthur was concerned that the demonstration had been taken over by communists and pacifists but the General Staff's intelligence division reported that only three of the march's 26 key leaders were communists. MacArthur went over contingency plans for civil disorder in the capital. Mechanized equipment was brought to Fort Myer, where anti-riot training was conducted.

On 28 July 1932, in a clash with the District police, two veterans were shot, and later died. President Herbert Hoover ordered MacArthur to "surround the affected area and clear it without delay". MacArthur brought up troops and tanks and, against the advice of Major Dwight D. Eisenhower, decided to accompany the troops, although he was not in charge of the operation. The troops advanced with bayonets and sabers drawn under a shower of bricks and rocks, but no shots were fired. In less than four hours, they cleared the Bonus Army's campground using tear gas. The gas canisters started a number of fires, causing the only death during the riots. While not as violent as other anti-riot operations, it was nevertheless a public relations disaster. However, the defeat of the "Bonus Army", while unpopular with the American people at large, did make MacArthur into the hero of the more right-wing elements in the Republican Party who believed that the general had saved America from a communist revolution in 1932.

In 1934, MacArthur sued journalists Drew Pearson and Robert S. Allen for defamation after they described his treatment of the Bonus marchers as "unwarranted, unnecessary, insubordinate, harsh and brutal". Also accused for proposing 19-gun salutes for friends, MacArthur asked for $750,000 to compensate for the damage to his reputation. In turn, the journalists threatened to call Isabel Rosario Cooper as a witness. MacArthur had met Isabel, a Eurasian teenager, while in the Philippines, and she had become his mistress. MacArthur was forced to settle out of court, secretly paying Pearson $15,000.

In the 1932 presidential election, Herbert Hoover was defeated by Franklin D. Roosevelt. MacArthur and Roosevelt had worked together before World War I and had remained friends despite their political differences. MacArthur supported the New Deal through the Army's operation of the Civilian Conservation Corps. He ensured that detailed plans were drawn up for its employment and decentralized its administration to the corps areas, which became an important factor in the program's success. MacArthur's support for a strong military, and his public criticism of pacifism and isolationism, made him unpopular with the Roosevelt administration.

Perhaps the most incendiary exchange between Roosevelt and MacArthur occurred over an administration proposal to cut 51% of the Army's budget. In response, MacArthur lectured Roosevelt that "when we lost the next war, and an American boy, lying in the mud with an enemy bayonet through his belly and an enemy foot on his dying throat, spat out his last curse, I wanted the name not to be MacArthur, but Roosevelt". In response, Roosevelt yelled, "you must not talk that way to the President!" MacArthur offered to resign, but Roosevelt refused his request, and MacArthur then staggered out of the White House and vomited on the front steps.

In spite of such exchanges, MacArthur was extended an extra year as chief of staff, and ended his tour in October 1935. For his service as chief of staff, he was awarded a second Distinguished Service Medal. He was retroactively awarded two Purple Hearts for his World War I service, a decoration that he authorized in 1932 based loosely on the defunct Military Badge of Merit. MacArthur insisted on being the first recipient of the Purple Heart, which he had engraved with "#1".

Field Marshal of the Philippine Army
When the Commonwealth of the Philippines achieved semi-independent status in 1935, President of the Philippines Manuel Quezon asked MacArthur to supervise the creation of a Philippine Army. Quezon and MacArthur had been personal friends since the latter's father had been Governor-General of the Philippines, 35 years earlier. With President Roosevelt's approval, MacArthur accepted the assignment. It was agreed that MacArthur would receive the rank of field marshal, with its salary and allowances, in addition to his major general's salary as Military Advisor to the Commonwealth Government of the Philippines. This made him the best-paid soldier in the world. It would be his fifth tour in the Far East. He brought Eisenhower and Major James B. Ord along as his assistants. Another passenger on the President Hoover was Jean Marie Faircloth, an unmarried 37-year-old socialite. Over the next two years, MacArthur and Faircloth were frequently seen together. His mother became gravely ill during the voyage and died in Manila on 3 December 1935.

President Quezon officially conferred the title of field marshal on MacArthur in a ceremony at Malacañan Palace on 24 August 1936. Eisenhower recalled finding the ceremony “rather fantastic”. He found it “pompous and rather ridiculous to be the field marshal of a virtually nonexisting army.” Eisenhower learned later on that the field-marshalship had not been (as he had assumed) Quezon's idea. “I was surprised to learn from him that he had not initiated the idea at all; rather, Quezon said that MacArthur himself came up with the high-sounding title.” (A persistent myth has pervaded the biographical literature, to the effect that MacArthur wore a "specially designed sharkskin uniform" at the 1936 ceremony to go with his new rank of Philippine Field Marshal. Richard Meixsel has debunked this story; in fact the special uniform was "the creation of a poorly informed journalist in 1937 who mistook a recently introduced U.S. Army white dress uniform for a distinctive field marshal's attire.")

The Philippine Army was formed from conscription. Training was conducted by a regular cadre, and the Philippine Military Academy was created along the lines of West Point to train officers. MacArthur and Eisenhower found that few of the training camps had been constructed and the first group of 20,000 trainees did not report until early 1937. Equipment and weapons were "more or less obsolete" American cast offs, and the budget was completely inadequate. MacArthur's requests for equipment fell on deaf ears, although MacArthur and his naval adviser, Lieutenant Colonel Sidney L. Huff, persuaded the Navy to initiate the development of the PT boat. Much hope was placed in the Philippine Army Air Corps, but the first squadron was not organized until 1939. Article XIX of the 1922 Washington Naval Treaty banned the construction of new fortifications or naval bases in all Pacific Ocean territories and colonies of the five signatories from 1923 to 1936. Also, military bases like at Clark and Corregidor were not allowed to be expanded or modernized during that 13-year period. For example, the Malinta Tunnel on Corregidor was constructed from 1932 to 1934 with condemned TNT and without a single dollar from the U.S. government because of the treaty. This added to the numerous challenges facing MacArthur and Quezon.

MacArthur married Jean Faircloth in a civil ceremony on 30 April 1937. Their marriage produced a son, Arthur MacArthur IV, who was born in Manila on 21 February 1938. On 31 December 1937, MacArthur officially retired from the Army. He ceased to represent the U.S. as military adviser to the government, but remained as Quezon's adviser in a civilian capacity. Eisenhower returned to the U.S., and was replaced as MacArthur's chief of staff by Lieutenant Colonel Richard K. Sutherland, while Richard J. Marshall became deputy chief of staff.

In Manila, MacArthur was a member of the Freemasons. At the time of the occupation of Japan, MacArthur belonged to Manila Lodge No. 1 and was in the 32nd Masonic rank.

World War II

Philippines campaign (1941–1942)

Defense of the Philippines
On 26 July 1941, Roosevelt federalized the Philippine Army, recalled MacArthur to active duty in the U.S. Army as a major general, and named him commander of U.S. Army Forces in the Far East (USAFFE). MacArthur was promoted to lieutenant general the following day, and then to general on 20 December. On 31 July 1941, the Philippine Department had 22,000 troops assigned, 12,000 of whom were Philippine Scouts. The main component was the Philippine Division, under the command of Major General Jonathan M. Wainwright. The initial American plan for the defense of the Philippines called for the main body of the troops to retreat to the Bataan peninsula in Manila Bay to hold out against the Japanese until a relief force could arrive. MacArthur changed this plan to one of attempting to hold all of Luzon and using B-17 Flying Fortresses to sink Japanese ships that approached the islands. MacArthur persuaded the decision-makers in Washington that his plans represented the best deterrent to prevent Japan from choosing war and of winning a war if worse did come to worse.

Between July and December 1941, the garrison received 8,500 reinforcements. After years of parsimony, much equipment was shipped. By November, a backlog of 1,100,000 shipping tons of equipment intended for the Philippines had accumulated in U.S. ports and depots awaiting vessels. In addition, the Navy intercept station in the islands, known as Station CAST, had an ultra-secret Purple cipher machine, which decrypted Japanese diplomatic messages, and partial codebooks for the latest JN-25 naval code. Station CAST sent MacArthur its entire output, via Sutherland, the only officer on his staff authorized to see it.

At 03:30 local time on 8 December 1941 (about 09:00 on 7 December in Hawaii), Sutherland learned of the attack on Pearl Harbor and informed MacArthur. At 05:30, the Chief of Staff of the U.S. Army, General George Marshall, ordered MacArthur to execute the existing war plan, Rainbow Five. This plan had been leaked to the American public by the Chicago Tribune three days prior, and the following day Germany had publicly ridiculed the plan. MacArthur did not follow Marshall's order. On three occasions, the commander of the Far East Air Force, Major General Lewis H. Brereton, requested permission to attack Japanese bases in Formosa, in accordance with prewar intentions, but was denied by Sutherland; Brereton instead ordered his aircraft to fly defensive patrol patterns, looking for Japanese warships. Not until 11:00 did Brereton speak with MacArthur, and obtained permission to begin Rainbow Five. MacArthur later denied having the conversation. At 12:30, nine hours after the attack on Pearl Harbor, aircraft of Japan's 11th Air Fleet achieved complete tactical surprise when they attacked Clark Field and the nearby fighter base at Iba Field, and destroyed or disabled 18 of Far East Air Force's 35 B-17s, caught on the ground refueling. Also destroyed were 53 of 107 P-40s, 3 P-35s, and more than 25 other aircraft. Substantial damage was done to the bases, and casualties totaled 80 killed and 150 wounded. What was left of the Far East Air Force was all but destroyed over the next few days.

MacArthur attempted to slow the Japanese advance with an initial defense against the Japanese landings. MacArthur's plan for holding all of Luzon against the Japanese collapsed, for it distributed the American-Filipino forces too thinly. However, he reconsidered his overconfidence in the ability of his Filipino troops after the Japanese landing force made a rapid advance following its landing at Lingayen Gulf on 21 December, and ordered a retreat to Bataan. Within two days of the Japanese landing at Lingayen Gulf, MacArthur had reverted to the pre-July 1941 plan of attempting to hold only Bataan while waiting for a relief force to come. However, this switching of plans came at a grueling price; most of the American and some of the Filipino troops were able to retreat back to Bataan, but without most of their supplies, which were abandoned in the confusion. Manila was declared an open city at midnight on 24 December, without any consultation with Admiral Thomas C. Hart, commanding the Asiatic Fleet, forcing the Navy to destroy considerable amounts of valuable materiel. The Asiatic Fleet's performance was not very optimal during December 1941. While the surface fleet was obsolete and was safely evacuated to try to defend the Dutch East Indies, there were over two dozen modern submarines assigned to Manila – Hart's strongest fighting force. The submariners were confident, but they were armed with the malfunctioning Mark 14 torpedo. They were unable to sink a single Japanese warship during the invasion. MacArthur thought the Navy betrayed him. The submarines were ordered to abandon the Philippines by the end of December after ineffective attacks on the Japanese fleet, only returning to Corregidor to evacuate high-ranking politicians or officers for the rest of the campaign.

On the evening of 24 December, MacArthur moved his headquarters to the island fortress of Corregidor in Manila Bay arriving at 21:30, with his headquarters reporting to Washington as being open on the 25th. A series of air raids by the Japanese destroyed all the exposed structures on the island and USAFFE headquarters was moved into the Malinta Tunnel. In the first-ever air raid on Corregidor on 29 December, Japanese airplanes bombed all the buildings on Topside including MacArthur's house and the barracks. MacArthur's family ran into the air raid shelter while MacArthur went outside to the garden of the house with some soldiers to observe and count the number of bombers involved in the raid when bombs destroyed the home. One bomb struck only ten feet from MacArthur and the soldiers shielded him with their bodies and helmets. Filipino sergeant Domingo Adversario was awarded the Silver Star and Purple Heart for getting his hand wounded by the bomb and covering MacArthur's head with his own helmet, which was also hit by shrapnel. MacArthur was not wounded. Later, most of the headquarters moved to Bataan, leaving only the nucleus with MacArthur. The troops on Bataan knew that they had been written off but continued to fight. Some blamed Roosevelt and MacArthur for their predicament. A ballad sung to the tune of "The Battle Hymn of the Republic" called him "Dugout Doug". However, most clung to the belief that somehow MacArthur "would reach down and pull something out of his hat".

On 1 January 1942, MacArthur accepted $500,000 from President Quezon of the Philippines as payment for his pre-war service. MacArthur's staff members also received payments: $75,000 for Sutherland, $45,000 for Richard Marshall, and $20,000 for Huff. Eisenhower—after being appointed Supreme Commander Allied Expeditionary Force (AEF)—was also offered money by Quezon, but declined. These payments were known only to a few in Manila and Washington, including President Roosevelt and Secretary of War Henry L. Stimson, until they were made public by historian Carol Petillo in 1979. While the payments had been fully legal, the revelation tarnished MacArthur's reputation.

Escape from the Philippines

In February 1942, as Japanese forces tightened their grip on the Philippines, President Roosevelt ordered MacArthur to relocate to Australia. On the night of 12 March 1942, MacArthur and a select group that included his wife Jean, son Arthur, Arthur's Cantonese amah, Ah Cheu, and other members of his staff, including Sutherland, Richard Marshall and Huff, left Corregidor. They traveled in PT boats through stormy seas patrolled by Japanese warships, and reached Del Monte Airfield on Mindanao, where B-17s picked them up, and flew them to Australia. MacArthur ultimately arrived in Melbourne by train on 21 March. His speech, in which he said, "I came through and I shall return", was first made on Terowie railway station in South Australia, on 20 March. Washington asked MacArthur to amend his promise to "We shall return". He ignored the request.

Bataan surrendered on 9 April, and Corregidor on 6 May.

Medal of Honor

George Marshall decided that MacArthur would be awarded the Medal of Honor, a decoration for which he had twice previously been nominated, "to offset any propaganda by the enemy directed at his leaving his command". Eisenhower pointed out that MacArthur had not actually performed any acts of valor as required by law, but Marshall cited the 1927 award of the medal to Charles Lindbergh as a precedent. Special legislation had been passed to authorize Lindbergh's medal, but while similar legislation was introduced authorizing the medal for MacArthur by Congressmen J. Parnell Thomas and James E. Van Zandt, Marshall felt strongly that a serving general should receive the medal from the President and the War Department, expressing that the recognition "would mean more" if the gallantry criteria were not waived by a bill of relief.

Marshall ordered Sutherland to recommend the award and authored the citation himself. Ironically, this also meant that it violated the governing statute, as it could only be considered lawful so long as material requirements were waived by Congress, such as the unmet requirement to perform conspicuous gallantry "above and beyond the call of duty". Marshall admitted the defect to the Secretary of War, acknowledging that "there is no specific act of General MacArthur's to justify the award of the Medal of Honor under a literal interpretation of the statutes". Similarly, when the Army's adjutant general reviewed the case in 1945, he determined that "authority for [MacArthur's] award is questionable under strict interpretation of regulations".

MacArthur had been nominated for the award twice before and understood that it was for leadership and not gallantry. He expressed the sentiment that "this award was intended not so much for me personally as it is a recognition of the indomitable courage of the gallant army which it was my honor to command". At the age of 62 MacArthur was the oldest living active-duty Medal of Honor recipient in history and as a four-star general, he was the highest-ranked military servicemember to ever receive the Medal of Honor. Arthur and Douglas MacArthur thus became the first father and son to be awarded the Medal of Honor. They remained the only pair until 2001, when Theodore Roosevelt was posthumously awarded for his service during the Spanish–American War, Theodore Roosevelt Jr. having received one posthumously for his gallantry during the World War II Normandy invasion. MacArthur's citation, written by Marshall, read:
As the symbol of the forces resisting the Japanese, MacArthur received many other accolades. The Native American tribes of the Southwest chose him as a "Chief of Chiefs", which he acknowledged as from "my oldest friends, the companions of my boyhood days on the Western frontier". He was touched when he was named Father of the Year for 1942, and wrote to the National Father's Day Committee that:

New Guinea Campaign

General Headquarters
On 18 April 1942, MacArthur was appointed Supreme Commander of Allied Forces in the Southwest Pacific Area (SWPA). Lieutenant General George Brett became Commander, Allied Air Forces, and Vice Admiral Herbert F. Leary became Commander, Allied Naval Forces. Since the bulk of land forces in the theater were Australian, George Marshall insisted an Australian be appointed as Commander, Allied Land Forces, and the job went to General Sir Thomas Blamey. Although predominantly Australian and American, MacArthur's command also included small numbers of personnel from the Netherlands East Indies, the United Kingdom, and other countries.

MacArthur established a close relationship with the prime minister of Australia, John Curtin, and was probably the second most-powerful person in the country after the prime minister, although many Australians resented MacArthur as a foreign general who had been imposed upon them. MacArthur had little confidence in Brett's abilities as commander of Allied Air Forces, and in August 1942 selected Major General George C. Kenney to replace him. Kenney's application of air power in support of Blamey's troops would prove crucial.

The staff of MacArthur's General Headquarters (GHQ) was built around the nucleus that had escaped from the Philippines with him, who became known as the "Bataan Gang". Though Roosevelt and George Marshall pressed for Dutch and Australian officers to be assigned to GHQ, the heads of all the staff divisions were American and such officers of other nationalities as were assigned served under them. Initially located in Melbourne, GHQ moved to Brisbane—the northernmost city in Australia with the necessary communications facilities—in July 1942, occupying the Australian Mutual Provident Society building (renamed after the war as MacArthur Chambers).

MacArthur formed his own signals intelligence organization, known as the Central Bureau, from Australian intelligence units and American cryptanalysts who had escaped from the Philippines. This unit forwarded Ultra information to MacArthur's Chief of Intelligence, Charles A. Willoughby, for analysis. After a press release revealed details of the Japanese naval dispositions during the Battle of the Coral Sea, at which a Japanese attempt to capture Port Moresby was turned back, Roosevelt ordered that censorship be imposed in Australia, and the Advisory War Council granted GHQ censorship authority over the Australian press. Australian newspapers were restricted to what was reported in the daily GHQ communiqué. Veteran correspondents considered the communiqués, which MacArthur drafted personally, "a total farce" and "Alice-in-Wonderland information handed out at high level".

Papuan Campaign
Anticipating that the Japanese would strike at Port Moresby again, the garrison was strengthened and MacArthur ordered the establishment of new bases at Merauke and Milne Bay to cover its flanks. The Battle of Midway in June 1942 led to consideration of a limited offensive in the Pacific. MacArthur's proposal for an attack on the Japanese base at Rabaul met with objections from the Navy, which favored a less ambitious approach, and objected to an Army general being in command of what would be an amphibious operation. The resulting compromise called for a three-stage advance. The first stage, the seizure of the Tulagi area, would be conducted by the Pacific Ocean Areas, under Admiral Chester W. Nimitz. The later stages would be under MacArthur's command.

The Japanese struck first, landing at Buna in July, and at Milne Bay in August. The Australians repulsed the Japanese at Milne Bay, but a series of defeats in the Kokoda Track campaign had a depressing effect back in Australia. On 30 August, MacArthur radioed Washington that unless action was taken, New Guinea Force would be overwhelmed. He sent Blamey to Port Moresby to take personal command. Having committed all available Australian troops, MacArthur decided to send American forces. The 32nd Infantry Division, a poorly trained National Guard division, was selected. A series of embarrassing reverses in the Battle of Buna–Gona led to outspoken criticism of the American troops by the Australians. MacArthur then ordered Lieutenant General Robert L. Eichelberger to assume command of the Americans, and "take Buna, or not come back alive".

MacArthur moved the advanced echelon of GHQ to Port Moresby on 6 November 1942. After Buna finally fell on 3 January 1943, MacArthur awarded the Distinguished Service Cross to twelve officers for "precise execution of operations". This use of the country's second highest award aroused resentment, because while some, like Eichelberger and George Alan Vasey, had fought in the field, others, like Sutherland and Willoughby, had not. For his part, MacArthur was awarded his third Distinguished Service Medal, and the Australian government had him appointed an honorary Knight Grand Cross of the British Order of the Bath.

New Guinea Campaign
At the Pacific Military Conference in March 1943, the Joint Chiefs of Staff approved MacArthur's plan for Operation Cartwheel, the advance on Rabaul. MacArthur explained his strategy:

Lieutenant General Walter Krueger's Sixth Army headquarters arrived in SWPA in early 1943 but MacArthur had only three American divisions, and they were tired and depleted from the fighting at Battle of Buna–Gona and Battle of Guadalcanal. As a result, "it became obvious that any military offensive in the South-West Pacific in 1943 would have to be carried out mainly by the Australian Army". The offensive began with the landing at Lae by the Australian 9th Division on 4 September 1943. The next day, MacArthur watched the landing at Nadzab by paratroops of the 503rd Parachute Infantry. His B-17 made the trip on three engines because one failed soon after leaving Port Moresby, but he insisted that it fly on to Nadzab. For this, he was awarded the Air Medal.

The Australian 7th and 9th Divisions converged on Lae, which fell on 16 September. MacArthur advanced his timetable, and ordered the 7th to capture Kaiapit and Dumpu, while the 9th mounted an amphibious assault on Finschhafen. Here, the offensive bogged down, partly because MacArthur had based his decision to assault Finschhafen on Willoughby's assessment that there were only 350 Japanese defenders at Finschhafen, when in fact there were nearly 5,000. A furious battle ensued.

In early November, MacArthur's plan for a westward advance along the coast of New Guinea to the Philippines was incorporated into plans for the war against Japan. Three months later, airmen reported no signs of enemy activity in the Admiralty Islands. Although Willoughby did not agree that the islands had been evacuated, MacArthur ordered an amphibious landing there, commencing the Admiralty Islands campaign. He accompanied the assault force aboard the light cruiser , the flagship of Vice Admiral Thomas C. Kinkaid, the new commander of the Seventh Fleet, and came ashore seven hours after the first wave of landing craft, for which he was awarded the Bronze Star. It took six weeks of fierce fighting before the 1st Cavalry Division captured the islands.

MacArthur had one of the most powerful PR machines of any Allied general during the war, which made him into an extremely popular war hero with the American people. In late 1943–early 1944, there was a serious effort by the conservative faction in the Republican Party centered in the Midwest to have MacArthur seek the Republican nomination to be the candidate for the presidency in the 1944 election, as they regarded the two men most likely to win the Republican nomination, namely Wendell Willkie and Governor Thomas E. Dewey of New York, as too liberal. For a time, MacArthur, who had long seen himself as a potential president, was in the words of the U.S historian Gerhard Weinberg "very interested" in running as the Republican candidate in 1944. However, MacArthur's vow to "return" to the Philippines had not been fulfilled in early 1944 and he decided not to run for president until he had liberated the Philippines.

Furthermore, Weinberg had argued that it is probable that Roosevelt, who knew of the "enormous gratuity" MacArthur had accepted from Quezon in 1942, had used his knowledge of this transaction to blackmail MacArthur into not running for president. Finally, despite the best efforts of the conservative Republicans to put MacArthur's name on the ballot, on 4 April 1944, Governor Dewey won such a convincing victory in the Wisconsin primary (regarded as a significant victory given that the Midwest was a stronghold of the conservative Republicans opposed to Dewey) as to ensure that he would win the Republican nomination to be the GOP's candidate for president in 1944.

MacArthur bypassed the Japanese forces at Hansa Bay and Wewak, and assaulted Hollandia and Aitape, which Willoughby reported being lightly defended based on intelligence gathered in the Battle of Sio. MacArthur's bold thrust by going 600 miles up the coast had surprised and confused the Japanese high command, who had not anticipated that MacArthur would take such risks. Although they were out of range of the Fifth Air Force's fighters based in the Ramu Valley, the timing of the operation allowed the aircraft carriers of Nimitz's Pacific Fleet to provide air support.

Though risky, the operation turned out to be another success. MacArthur caught the Japanese off balance and cut off Lieutenant General Hatazō Adachi's Japanese XVIII Army in the Wewak area. Because the Japanese were not expecting an attack, the garrison was weak, and Allied casualties were correspondingly light. However, the terrain turned out to be less suitable for airbase development than first thought, forcing MacArthur to seek better locations further west. While bypassing Japanese forces had great tactical merit, it had the strategic drawback of tying up Allied troops to contain them. Moreover, Adachi was far from beaten, which he demonstrated in the Battle of Driniumor River.

Philippines Campaign (1944–45)

Leyte
In July 1944, President Roosevelt summoned MacArthur to meet with him in Hawaii "to determine the phase of action against Japan". Nimitz made the case for attacking Formosa. MacArthur stressed America's moral obligation to liberate the Philippines and won Roosevelt's support. In September, Admiral William Halsey Jr.'s carriers made a series of air strikes on the Philippines. Opposition was feeble; Halsey concluded, incorrectly, that Leyte was "wide open" and possibly undefended, and recommended that projected operations be skipped in favor of an assault on Leyte.

On 20 October 1944, troops of Krueger's Sixth Army landed on Leyte, while MacArthur watched from the light cruiser . That afternoon he arrived off the beach. The advance had not progressed far; snipers were still active and the area was under sporadic mortar fire. When his whaleboat grounded in knee-deep water, MacArthur requested a landing craft, but the beachmaster was too busy to grant his request. MacArthur was compelled to wade ashore. In his prepared speech, he said:

Since Leyte was out of range of Kenney's land-based aircraft, MacArthur was dependent on carrier aircraft. Japanese air activity soon increased, with raids on Tacloban, where MacArthur decided to establish his headquarters, and on the fleet offshore. MacArthur enjoyed staying on Nashvilles bridge during air raids, although several bombs landed close by, and two nearby cruisers were hit. Over the next few days, the Japanese counterattacked in the Battle of Leyte Gulf, resulting in a near-disaster that MacArthur attributed to the command being divided between himself and Nimitz. Nor did the campaign ashore proceed smoothly. Heavy monsoonal rains disrupted the airbase construction program. Carrier aircraft proved to be no substitute for land-based aircraft, and the lack of air cover permitted the Japanese to pour troops into Leyte. Adverse weather and tough Japanese resistance slowed the American advance, resulting in a protracted campaign.

By the end of December, Krueger's headquarters estimated that 5,000 Japanese remained on Leyte, and on 26 December MacArthur issued a communiqué announcing that "the campaign can now be regarded as closed except for minor mopping up". Yet Eichelberger's Eighth Army killed another 27,000 Japanese on Leyte before the campaign ended in May 1945. On 18 December 1944, MacArthur was promoted to the new five-star rank of General of the Army, placing him in the company of Marshall and followed by Eisenhower and Henry "Hap" Arnold, the only four men to achieve the rank in World War II. Including Omar Bradley who was promoted during the Korean War so as not to be outranked by MacArthur, they were the only five men to achieve the rank of General of the Army since the 5 August 1888 death of Philip Sheridan. MacArthur was senior to all but Marshall. The rank was created by an Act of Congress when Public Law 78–482 was passed on 14 December 1944, as a temporary rank, subject to reversion to permanent rank six months after the end of the war. The temporary rank was then declared permanent 23 March 1946 by Public Law 333 of the 79th Congress, which also awarded full pay and allowances in the grade to those on the retired list.

Luzon
MacArthur's next move was the invasion of Mindoro, where there were good potential airfield sites. Willoughby estimated, correctly as it turned out, that the island had only about 1,000 Japanese defenders. The problem this time was getting there. Kinkaid balked at sending escort carriers into the restricted waters of the Sulu Sea, and Kenney could not guarantee land based air cover. The operation was clearly hazardous, and MacArthur's staff talked him out of accompanying the invasion on Nashville. As the invasion force entered the Sulu Sea, a kamikaze struck Nashville, killing 133 people and wounding 190 more. Australian and American engineers had three airstrips in operation within two weeks, but the resupply convoys were repeatedly attacked by kamikazes. During this time, MacArthur quarreled with Sutherland, notorious for his abrasiveness, over the latter's mistress, Captain Elaine Clark. MacArthur had instructed Sutherland not to be bring Clark to Leyte, due to a personal undertaking to Curtin that Australian women on the GHQ staff would not be taken to the Philippines, but Sutherland had brought her along anyway.

The way was now clear for the invasion of Luzon. This time, based on different interpretations of the same intelligence data, Willoughby estimated the strength of General Tomoyuki Yamashita's forces on Luzon at 137,000, while Sixth Army estimated it at 234,000. MacArthur's response was "Bunk!". He felt that even Willoughby's estimate was too high. "Audacity, calculated risk, and a clear strategic aim were MacArthur's attributes", and he disregarded the estimates. In fact, they were too low; Yamashita had more than 287,000 troops on Luzon. This time, MacArthur traveled aboard the light cruiser , watching as the ship was nearly hit by a bomb and torpedoes fired by midget submarines. His communiqué read: "The decisive battle for the liberation of the Philippines and the control of the Southwest Pacific is at hand. General MacArthur is in personal command at the front and landed with his assault troops."

MacArthur's primary concern was the capture of the port of Manila and the airbase at Clark Field, which were required to support future operations. He urged his commanders on. On 25 January 1945, he moved his advanced headquarters forward to Hacienda Luisita, closer to the front than Krueger's. He ordered the 1st Cavalry Division to conduct a rapid advance on Manila. It reached the northern outskirts of Manila on 3 February, but, unknown to the Americans, Rear Admiral Sanji Iwabuchi had decided to defend Manila to the death. The Battle of Manila raged for the next three weeks. To spare the civilian population, MacArthur prohibited the use of air strikes, but thousands of civilians died in the crossfire or Japanese massacres. He also refused to restrict the traffic of civilians who clogged the roads in and out of Manila, placing humanitarian concerns above military ones except in emergencies. For his part in the capture of Manila, MacArthur was awarded his third Distinguished Service Cross.

After taking Manila, MacArthur installed one of his Filipino friends, Manuel Roxas—who also happened to be one of the few people who knew about the huge sum of money Quezon had given MacArthur in 1942—into a position of power that ensured Roxas was to become the next Filipino president. Roxas had been a leading Japanese collaborator serving in the puppet government of José Laurel, but MacArthur claimed that Roxas had secretly been an American agent all the long. About MacArthur's claim that Roxas was really part of the resistance, Weinberg wrote that "evidence to this effect has yet to surface", and that by favoring the Japanese collaborator Roxas, MacArthur ensured there was no serious effort to address the issue of Filipino collaboration with the Japanese after the war. There was evidence that Roxas used his position of working in the Japanese puppet government to secretly gather intelligence to pass onto guerillas, MacArthur, and his intelligence staff during the occupation period.

One of the major reasons for MacArthur to return to the Philippines was to liberate prisoner-of-war camps and civilian internee camps as well as to relieve the Filipino civilians suffering at the hands of the very brutal Japanese occupiers. MacArthur authorized daring rescue raids at numerous prison camps like Cabanatuan, Los Baños, and Santo Tomas. At Santo Tomas Japanese guards held 200 prisoners hostage, but the U.S. soldiers were able to negotiate safe passage for the Japanese to escape peacefully in exchange for the release of the prisoners.

After the Battle of Manila, MacArthur turned his attention to Yamashita, who had retreated into the mountains of central and northern Luzon. Yamashita chose to fight a defensive campaign, being pushed back slowly by Krueger, and was still holding out at the time the war ended, much to MacArthur's intense annoyance as he had wished to liberate the entire Philippines before the war ended. On 2 September 1945, Yamashita (who had a hard time believing that the Emperor had ordered Japan to sign an armistice) came down from the mountains to surrender with some 100,000 of his men.

Southern Philippines

Although MacArthur had no specific directive to do so, and the fighting on Luzon was far from over, he committed his forces to liberate the remainder of the Philippines. In the GHQ communiqué on 5 July, he announced that the Philippines had been liberated and all operations ended, although Yamashita still held out in northern Luzon. Starting in May 1945, MacArthur used his Australian troops in the invasion of Borneo. He accompanied the assault on Labuan, and visited the troops ashore. While returning to GHQ in Manila, he visited Davao, where he told Eichelberger that no more than 4,000 Japanese remained alive on Mindanao. A few months later, six times that number surrendered. In July 1945, he was awarded his fourth Distinguished Service Medal.

As part of preparations for Operation Downfall, the invasion of Japan, MacArthur became commander in chief U.S. Army Forces Pacific (AFPAC) in April 1945, assuming command of all Army and Army Air Force units in the Pacific except the Twentieth Air Force. At the same time, Nimitz became commander of all naval forces. Command in the Pacific therefore remained divided. During his planning of the invasion of Japan, MacArthur stressed to the decision-makers in Washington that it was essential to have the Soviet Union enter the war as he argued it was crucial to have the Red Army tie down the Kwantung army in Manchuria. The invasion was pre-empted by the surrender of Japan in August 1945. On 2 September MacArthur accepted the formal Japanese surrender aboard the battleship , thus ending hostilities in World War II. In recognition of his role as a maritime strategist, the U.S. Navy awarded him the Navy Distinguished Service Medal.

Occupation of Japan

Protecting the Emperor
On 29 August 1945, MacArthur was ordered to exercise authority through the Japanese government machinery, including the Emperor Hirohito. MacArthur's headquarters was located in the Dai Ichi Life Insurance Building in Tokyo. Unlike in Germany, where the Allies had in May 1945 abolished the German state, the Americans chose to allow the Japanese state to continue to exist, albeit under their ultimate control. Unlike Germany, there was a certain partnership between the occupiers and occupied as MacArthur decided to rule Japan via the Emperor and most of the rest of the Japanese elite. The Emperor was a living god to the Japanese people, and MacArthur found that ruling via the Emperor made his job in running Japan much easier than it otherwise would have been.

After the Japanese surrender in August 1945, there was a large amount of pressure that came from both Allied countries and Japanese leftists that demanded the emperor step down and be indicted as a war criminal. MacArthur disagreed, as he thought that an ostensibly cooperating emperor would help establish a peaceful allied occupation regime in Japan. Inspired by U.S. psychological warfare, since all Japanese trust the emperor, MacArthur wanted to gain the trust of the Japanese people and turn it against them by retaining the emperor. Since retaining the emperor was crucial to ensuring control over the population, the allied forces aimed to immunize him from war responsibility, never undermine his authority, and maximize the use of existing Japanese government organizations. Any possible evidence that would incriminate the emperor and his family were excluded from the International Military Tribunal for the Far East.

Code-named Operation Blacklist, MacArthur created a plan that separated the emperor from the militarists, retained the emperor as a constitutional monarch but only as a figurehead, and used the emperor to retain control over Japan and help the U.S. achieve their objectives. The American historian Herbert P. Bix described the relationship between the general and the Emperor as: "the Allied commander would use the Emperor, and the Emperor would cooperate in being used. Their relationship became one of expediency and mutual protection, of more political benefit to Hirohito than to MacArthur because Hirohito had more to lose—the entire panoply of symbolic, legitimizing properties of the imperial throne".

At the same time, MacArthur undermined the imperial mystique when his staff released a picture of his first meeting with the Emperor, the impact of which on the Japanese public was electric as the Japanese people for the first time saw the Emperor as a mere man overshadowed by the much taller MacArthur instead of the living god he had always been portrayed as. Up to 1945, the Emperor had been a remote, mysterious figure to his people, rarely seen in public and always silent, whose photographs were always taken from a certain angle to make him look taller and more impressive than he really was. No Japanese photographer would have taken such a photo of the Emperor being overshadowed by MacArthur. The Japanese government immediately banned the photo of the Emperor with MacArthur on the grounds that it damaged the imperial mystique, but MacArthur rescinded the ban and ordered all of the Japanese newspapers to print it. The photo was intended as a message to the Emperor about who was going to be the senior partner in their relationship.

As he needed the Emperor, MacArthur protected him from any effort to hold him accountable for his actions, and allowed him to issue statements that incorrectly portrayed the emerging democratic post-war era as a continuation of the Meiji era reforms. MacArthur did not allow any investigations of the Emperor, and instead in October 1945 ordered his staff "in the interests of peaceful occupation and rehabilitation of Japan, prevention of revolution and communism, all facts surrounding the execution of the declaration of war and subsequent position of the Emperor which tend to show fraud, menace or duress be marshalled". In January 1946, MacArthur reported to Washington that the Emperor could not be indicted for war crimes on the grounds:

To protect the Emperor from being indicted, MacArthur had one of his staff, Brigadier General Bonner Fellers, tell the genrō Admiral Mitsumasa Yonai on 6 March 1946:

From the viewpoint of both sides, having one especially evil figure in the form of General Hideki Tojo, on whom everything that went wrong could be blamed, was most politically convenient. At a second meeting on 22 March 1946, Fellers told Yonai: 

MacArthur's attempts to shield the Emperor from indictment and to have all the blame taken by Tojo were successful, which as Bix commented, "had a lasting and profoundly distorting impact on the Japanese understanding of the lost war".

War crimes trials

MacArthur was responsible for confirming and enforcing the sentences for war crimes handed down by the International Military Tribunal for the Far East. In late 1945, Allied military commissions in various cities in Asia tried 5,700 Japanese, Taiwanese and Koreans for war crimes. About 4,300 were convicted, almost 1,000 sentenced to death, and hundreds given life imprisonment. The charges arose from incidents that included the Rape of Nanking, the Bataan Death March and Manila massacre. The trial in Manila of Yamashita was criticized because he was hanged for Iwabuchi's Manila massacre, which he had not ordered and of which he was probably unaware. Iwabuchi had killed himself as the battle for Manila was ending.

MacArthur recommended that Shiro Ishii and other members of Unit 731 be granted immunity from prosecution in exchange for germ warfare data based on human experimentation. He also exempted the Emperor and all members of the imperial family implicated in war crimes, including princes such as Chichibu, Asaka, Takeda, Higashikuni and Fushimi, from criminal prosecutions. MacArthur confirmed that the emperor's abdication would not be necessary. In doing so, he ignored the advice of many members of the imperial family and Japanese intellectuals who publicly called for the abdication of the Emperor and the implementation of a regency. His reasoning was if the emperor were executed or sentenced to life imprisonment there would be a violent backlash and revolution from the Japanese from all social classes and this would interfere with his primary goal to change Japan from a militarist, feudal society to a pro-Western modern democracy. In a cable sent to General Dwight Eisenhower in February 1946 MacArthur said executing or imprisoning the emperor would require the use of one million occupation soldiers to keep the peace.

Supreme Commander for the Allied Powers
As Supreme Commander for the Allied Powers (SCAP) in Japan, MacArthur and his staff helped Japan rebuild itself, eradicate militarism and ultra-nationalism, promote political civil liberties, institute democratic government, and chart a new course that ultimately made Japan one of the world's leading industrial powers. The U.S. was firmly in control of Japan to oversee its reconstruction, and MacArthur was effectively the interim leader of Japan from 1945 until 1948. In 1946, MacArthur's staff drafted a new constitution that renounced war and stripped the Emperor of his military authority. The constitution—which became effective on 3 May 1947—instituted a parliamentary system of government, under which the Emperor acted only on the advice of his ministers. It included Article 9, which outlawed belligerency as an instrument of state policy and the maintenance of a standing army. The constitution also enfranchised women, guaranteed fundamental human rights, outlawed racial discrimination, strengthened the powers of Parliament and the Cabinet, and decentralized the police and local government.

A major land reform was also conducted, led by Wolf Ladejinsky of MacArthur's SCAP staff. By 1950, 89% of all agricultural land was owner-operated and only 11% was tenant-operated. MacArthur's efforts to encourage trade union membership met with phenomenal success, and by 1947, 48% of the non-agricultural workforce was unionized. Some of MacArthur's reforms were rescinded in 1948 when his unilateral control of Japan was ended by the increased involvement of the State Department. During the Occupation, SCAP successfully, if not entirely, abolished many of the financial coalitions known as the Zaibatsu, which had previously monopolized industry. Eventually, looser industrial groupings known as Keiretsu evolved. The reforms alarmed many in the U.S. Departments of Defense and State, who believed they conflicted with the prospect of Japan and its industrial capacity as a bulwark against the spread of communism in Asia.

In 1947 MacArthur invited the founder and first executive director of the American Civil Liberties Union (ACLU), Roger Nash Baldwin, to teach the Japanese government and people about civil rights and civil liberties. MacArthur also asked him to do the same for southern Korea, which MacArthur was responsible for when it was under U.S. Army occupation. MacArthur ignored members of the House Un-American Activities Committee and the FBI who believed that Baldwin was a Soviet-loving communist. He wanted a civil liberties expert to quickly introduce western-style civil rights to the Japanese and thought conservatives would take too long. Baldwin helped found the Japan Civil Liberties Union. In a confidential letter to ACLU leaders the anti-militarist and very liberal Baldwin said about MacArthur, "His observation on civil liberties and democracy rank with the best I ever heard from any civilian — and they were incredible from a general."

Japan's hereditary peerage, called kazoku, that lasted for over a millennium in different but essentially similar forms, was abolished by the new Japanese constitution that was heavily influenced by MacArthur. This was similar to the European peerage system involving princes, barons and counts who were not part of the royal family. Also, the extended royal family, called ōke and shinnōke, was abolished and stripped of all rights and privileges, transforming into commoners immediately. The only Japanese who were allowed to call themselves a part of royalty or nobility after the U.S. occupation were the Emperor and about 20 of his direct family members. This action by MacArthur and the writers of the constitution helped transform Japan drastically by abolishing all of the old extended royal family class and the nobility class.

MacArthur ruled Japan with a soft-handed approach. He legalized the Japanese Communist Party despite reservations from the United States government out of a desire for Japan to be truly democratic and invited them to take part in the 1946 election, which was also the first ever election to allow women to vote. He ordered the release of all political prisoners of the Imperial Japanese era, including communist prisoners. The first May Day parade in 11 years in 1946 was greenlit by MacArthur also. On the day before the May Day celebrations, which would involve 300,000 Japanese communists demonstrating with red flags and pro-Marxism chants in front of the Tokyo Imperial Palace and the Dai-Ichi Building, a group of would-be assassins led by Hideo Tokayama who planned to assassinate MacArthur with hand grenades and pistols on May Day were stopped and some of its members were arrested. Despite this plot the May Day demonstrations went on. MacArthur stopped the Communist Party from gaining any popularity in Japan by releasing their members from prison, conducting landmark land reform that made MacArthur more popular than communism for the rural Japanese farmers and peasants, and allowing the communists to freely participate in elections. In the 1946 election they won only 6 seats.

MacArthur was also in charge of southern Korea from 1945 to 1948 due to the lack of clear orders or initiative from Washington, D.C. There was no plan or guideline given to MacArthur from the Joint Chiefs of Staff or the State Department on how to rule Korea so what resulted was a very tumultuous 3 year military occupation that led to the creation of the U.S.-friendly Republic of Korea in 1948. He ordered Lieutenant General John R. Hodge, who accepted the surrender of Japanese forces in southern Korea in September 1945, to govern that area on SCAP's behalf and report to him in Tokyo.

In 1948, MacArthur made a bid to win the Republican nomination for president, which was the most serious of several efforts he made over the years. MacArthur's status as one of America's most popular war heroes together with his reputation as the statesman who had "transformed" Japan gave him a strong basis for running for president, but MacArthur's lack of connections within the GOP were a major handicap. MacArthur's strongest supporters came from the quasi-isolationist, Midwestern wing of the Republicans and embraced men such as Brigadier General Hanford MacNider, Philip La Follette, and Brigadier General Robert E. Wood, a diverse collection of "Old Right" and Progressive Republicans only united by a belief that the U.S. was too much involved in Europe for its own good. MacArthur declined to campaign for the presidency himself, but he privately encouraged his supporters to put his name on the ballot. MacArthur had always stated he would retire when a peace treaty was signed with Japan, and his push in the fall of 1947 to have the U.S sign a peace treaty with Japan was intended to allow him to retire on a high note, and thus campaign for the presidency. For the same reasons, Truman subverted MacArthur's efforts to have a peace treaty signed in 1947, saying that more time was needed before the U.S. could formally make peace with Japan. Truman in fact was so worried about MacArthur becoming president that in 1947 he asked General Dwight Eisenhower (who, similar to Truman, did not like MacArthur either) to run for president and Truman would happily be his running mate. In 1951 he asked Eisenhower again to run to stop MacArthur. Eisenhower asked, "What about MacArthur?" Truman said, "I'm going to take care of MacArthur. You'll see what happens to MacArthur."

Without a peace treaty, MacArthur decided not to resign while at the same time writing letters to Wood saying he would be more than happy to accept the Republican nomination if it were offered to him. In late 1947 and early 1948, MacArthur received several Republican grandees in Tokyo. On 9 March 1948 MacArthur issued a press statement declaring his interest in being the Republican nominee for president, saying he would be honored if the Republican Party were to nominate him, but would not resign from the Army to campaign for the presidency. The press statement had been forced by Wood, who told MacArthur that it was impossible to campaign for a man who was not officially running for president, and that MacArthur could either declare his candidacy or see Wood cease campaigning for him. MacArthur's supporters made a major effort to win the Wisconsin Republican primary held on 6 April 1948. MacArthur's refusal to campaign badly hurt his chances and it was won to everybody's surprise by Harold Stassen. The defeat in Wisconsin followed by defeat in Nebraska effectively ended MacArthur's chances of winning the Republican nomination, but MacArthur refused to withdraw his name until the 1948 Republican National Convention, at which Governor Thomas Dewey of New York was nominated.

In an address to Congress on 19 April 1951, MacArthur declared:

MacArthur handed over power to the Japanese government in 1949, but remained in Japan until relieved by President Harry S. Truman on 11 April 1951. The San Francisco Peace Treaty, signed on 8 September 1951, marked the end of the Allied occupation, and when it went into effect on 28 April 1952, Japan was once again an independent state. The Japanese subsequently gave MacArthur the nickname  ('The foreign Shogun') but not until around the time of his death in 1964.

Korean War

South to the Naktong, North to the Yalu

On 25 June 1950, North Korea invaded South Korea, starting the Korean War. The United Nations Security Council passed in quick succession Resolution 82, Resolution 83, Resolution 84 and Resolution 85 which authorized a United Nations Command (UNC) force to assist South Korea. The UN empowered the American government to select a commander, and the Joint Chiefs of Staff unanimously recommended MacArthur. He therefore became commander-in-chief of the UNC, while remaining SCAP in Japan and Commander-in-Chief, Far East. All South Korean forces were placed under his command. As they retreated before the North Korean onslaught, MacArthur received permission to commit U.S. ground forces. All the first units to arrive could do was trade men and ground for time, falling back to the Pusan Perimeter. By the end of August, the crisis subsided. North Korean attacks on the perimeter had tapered off. While the North Korean force numbered 88,000 troops, Lieutenant General Walton Walker's Eighth Army now numbered 180,000, and he had more tanks and artillery pieces.

In 1949, the Chairman of the Joint Chiefs of Staff, General of the Army Omar Bradley, had predicted that "large scale combined amphibious operations ... will never occur again", but by July 1950, MacArthur was planning just such an operation. MacArthur compared his plan with that of General James Wolfe at the Battle of the Plains of Abraham, and brushed aside the problems of tides, hydrography and terrain. In September, despite lingering concerns from superiors, MacArthur's soldiers and Marines made a successful landing at Inchon, deep behind North Korean lines. Launched with naval and close air support, the landing outflanked the North Koreans, recaptured Seoul and forced them to retreat northward in disarray. Visiting the battlefield on 17 September, MacArthur surveyed six T-34 tanks that had been knocked out by Marines, ignoring sniper fire around him, except to note that the North Korean marksmen were poorly trained.

On 11 September, Truman issued orders for an advance beyond the 38th parallel into North Korea. There was controversy over whether U.S. troops should cross the 38th parallel with only the approval from the U.S. government because the original UN resolution only called for the restoration of South Korea below the 38th parallel. MacArthur was very hesitant about advancing north of the 38th parallel and waited for further instructions. Secretary of Defense George Marshall ordered MacArthur on 30 September to feel "unhampered tactically and strategically to proceed north of 38th parallel.” This ambiguity was finally resolved by the UN General Assembly greenlighting MacArthur to advance northward on 4 October with Resolution 376(V), which authorized him and UN forces to cross the 38th parallel and to unify all of Korea under the Republic of Korea. The Joint Chiefs of Staff on 7 October further clarified to MacArthur that the official mandate for UN forces was the unification of a democratic Korea. MacArthur now planned another amphibious assault, on Wonsan on the east coast, but it fell to South Korean troops before the 1st Marine Division could reach it by sea. In October, MacArthur met with Truman at the Wake Island Conference, with Truman emulating Roosevelt's wartime meeting with MacArthur in Hawaii. The president awarded MacArthur his fifth Distinguished Service Medal. Briefly questioned about the Chinese threat, MacArthur dismissed it, saying that he hoped to be able to withdraw the Eighth Army to Japan by Christmas, and to release a division for service in Europe in January. He regarded the possibility of Soviet intervention as a more serious threat.

On 20 October MacArthur flew to the Sukchon-Sunchon area of North Korea, north of Pyongyang, to supervise and observe an airborne operation by the 187th Airborne Regimental Combat Team. This was the first of two airborne operations done by UN forces during the Korean War. MacArthur's unarmed airplane was subject to attack by enemy aircraft known to be based at Sinuiju. MacArthur received a Distinguished Flying Cross for supervising the operation in person.

A month later, things had changed. The enemy were engaged by the UN forces at the Battle of Unsan in late October, which demonstrated the presence of Chinese soldiers in Korea and rendered significant losses to the American and other UN troops. Nevertheless, Willoughby downplayed the evidence about Chinese intervention in the war. He estimated that up to 71,000 Chinese soldiers were in the country, while the true number was closer to 300,000. He was not alone in this miscalculation. On 24 November, the Central Intelligence Agency reported to Truman that while there could be as many as 200,000 Chinese troops in Korea, "there is no evidence that the Chinese Communists plan major offensive operations".

That day, MacArthur flew to Walker's headquarters and he later wrote: MacArthur flew over the front line himself in his Douglas C-54 Skymaster but saw no signs of a Chinese build up and therefore decided to wait before ordering an advance or withdrawal. Evidence of the Chinese activity was hidden to MacArthur: the Chinese Army traveled at night and dug in during the day. For his reconnaissance efforts, MacArthur was nonetheless awarded the honorary combat pilot's wings.

China entered the war 

China's decision to intervene in the Korean War was based in part on MacArthur's public statements that he wanted to extend the war into China and return the Kuomintang regime to power. MacArthur's comments reinforced Chinese decision-makers' fears that the American-led invasion of North Korea was part of a strategy to ultimately invade China. The theory that Chinese leader Mao Zedong only entered the war because of MacArthur's Yalu offensive and comments has been accepted without question for many decades after the Korean War. However, recent research from historian Arthur L. Herman and others in the 2010s, citing evidence from Chinese historical archives, showed that Mao actually planned on directly intervening in the Korean War ever since July 1950, when the first American soldiers landed in South Korea, long before the Inchon and Yalu battles and long before MacArthur's public statements regarding Taiwan and China in late August 1950. The Chinese were planning to get involved in Korea with or without MacArthur's Yalu offensive. In fact, China had already indirectly intervened in the beginning of the Korean War by transferring 69,200 People's Liberation Army soldiers, who were Chinese citizens with Korean ethnicity, to the North Korean Korean People's Army in 1949-50. These three Chinese army divisions that were transferred to North Korea were the 156th Division, 164th Division, and 166th Division. These former Chinese soldiers turned North Korean soldiers made up 47% of North Korea's 148,680-man army by June 1950.

On 25 November 1950, Walker's Eighth Army was attacked by the Chinese Army and soon the UN forces were in retreat. MacArthur provided the chief of staff, General J. Lawton Collins, with a series of nine successive withdrawal lines. On 23 December, Walker was killed when his jeep collided with a truck, and was replaced by Lieutenant General Matthew Ridgway, whom MacArthur had selected in case of such an eventuality. Ridgway noted that MacArthur's "prestige, which had gained an extraordinary luster after Inchon, was badly tarnished. His credibility suffered in the unforeseen outcome of the November offensive ..."

Collins discussed the possible use of nuclear weapons in Korea with MacArthur in December, and later asked him for a list of targets in the Soviet Union in case it entered the war. MacArthur testified before the Congress in 1951 that he had never recommended the use of nuclear weapons. He did at one point consider a plan to cut off North Korea with radioactive poisons; he did not recommend it at the time, although he later broached the matter with Eisenhower, then president-elect, in 1952. In 1954, in an interview published after his death, he stated he had wanted to drop atomic bombs on enemy bases, but in 1960, he challenged a statement by Truman that he had advocated using atomic bombs. Truman issued a retraction, stating that he had no evidence of the claim; it was merely his personal opinion.

In April 1951, the Joint Chiefs of Staff drafted orders for MacArthur authorizing nuclear attacks on Manchuria and the Shandong Peninsula if the Chinese launched airstrikes originating from there against his forces. The next day Truman met with the chairman of the United States Atomic Energy Commission, Gordon Dean, and arranged for the transfer of nine Mark 4 nuclear bombs to military control. Dean was apprehensive about delegating the decision on how they should be used to MacArthur, who lacked expert technical knowledge of the weapons and their effects. The Joint Chiefs were not entirely comfortable about giving them to MacArthur either, for fear that he might prematurely carry out his orders. Instead, they decided that the nuclear strike force would report to the Strategic Air Command.

Removal from command

Within weeks of the Chinese attack, MacArthur was forced to retreat from North Korea. Seoul fell in January 1951, and both Truman and MacArthur were forced to contemplate the prospect of abandoning Korea entirely. European countries did not share MacArthur's world view, distrusted his judgment, and were afraid that he might use his stature and influence with the American public to re-focus American policy away from Europe and towards Asia. They were concerned that this might lead to a major war with China, possibly involving nuclear weapons. Since in February 1950 the Soviet Union and China had signed a defensive alliance committing each to go to war if the other party was attacked, the possibility that an American attack on China would cause World War III was considered to be very real at the time.  In a visit to the United States in December 1950, the British prime minister, Clement Attlee, had raised the fears of the British and other European governments that "General MacArthur was running the show".

Under Ridgway's command, the Eighth Army pressed north again in January. He inflicted heavy casualties on the Chinese, recaptured Seoul in March 1951, and pushed on to the 38th Parallel. With the improved military situation, Truman now saw the opportunity to offer a negotiated peace but, on 24 March, MacArthur called upon China to admit that it had been defeated, simultaneously challenging both the Chinese and his own superiors. Truman's proposed announcement was shelved.

On 5 April, Representative Joseph William Martin Jr., the Republican leader in the House of Representatives, read aloud on the floor of the House a letter from MacArthur critical of Truman's Europe-first policy and limited-war strategy. The letter concluded with:

In March 1951, secret United States intercepts of diplomatic dispatches disclosed clandestine conversations in which General MacArthur expressed confidence to the Tokyo embassies of Spain and Portugal that he would succeed in expanding the Korean War into a full-scale conflict with the Chinese Communists. When the intercepts came to the attention of President Truman, he was enraged to learn that MacArthur was not only trying to increase public support for his position on conducting the war, but had secretly informed foreign governments that he planned to initiate actions that were counter to United States policy. The President was unable to act immediately since he could not afford to reveal the existence of the intercepts and because of MacArthur's popularity with the public and political support in Congress. However, following the release on 5 April by Representative Martin of MacArthur's letter, Truman concluded he could relieve MacArthur of his commands without incurring unacceptable political damage.

Truman summoned Secretary of Defense George Marshall, Chairman of the Joint Chiefs Omar Bradley, Secretary of State Dean Acheson and Averell Harriman to discuss what to do about MacArthur. They concurred MacArthur should be relieved of his command, but made no recommendation to do so. Although they felt that it was correct "from a purely military point of view", they were aware that there were important political considerations as well. Truman and Acheson agreed that MacArthur was insubordinate, but the Joint Chiefs avoided any suggestion of this. Insubordination was a military offense, and MacArthur could have requested a public court martial similar to that of Billy Mitchell. The outcome of such a trial was uncertain, and it might well have found him not guilty and ordered his reinstatement. The Joint Chiefs agreed that there was "little evidence that General MacArthur had ever failed to carry out a direct order of the Joint Chiefs, or acted in opposition to an order". "In point of fact", Bradley insisted, "MacArthur had stretched but not legally violated any JCS directives. He had violated the President's 6 December directive [not to make public statements on policy matters], relayed to him by the JCS, but this did not constitute violation of a JCS order." Truman ordered MacArthur's relief by Ridgway, and the order went out on 10 April with Bradley's signature.

In a 3 December 1973 article in Time magazine, Truman was quoted as saying in the early 1960s:

The relief of the famous general by the unpopular politician created a storm of public controversy. Polls showed that the majority of the public disapproved of the decision to relieve MacArthur. By February 1952, almost nine months later, Truman's approval rating had fallen to 22 percent. , that remains the lowest Gallup Poll approval rating recorded by any serving president. As the increasingly unpopular war in Korea dragged on, Truman's administration was beset with a series of corruption scandals, and he eventually decided not to run for re-election. Beginning on 3 May 1951, a Joint Senate Committee—chaired by Democrat Richard Russell Jr.—investigated MacArthur's removal. It concluded that "the removal of General MacArthur was within the constitutional powers of the President but the circumstances were a shock to national pride".

Later life

A day after his arrival in San Francisco from Korea on 18 April 1951, MacArthur flew with his family to Washington, D.C., where he was scheduled to address a joint session of Congress.  It was his and Jean's first visit to the continental United States since 1937, when they had been married; Arthur IV, now aged 13, had never been to the U.S. On 19 April, MacArthur made his last official appearance in a farewell address to the U.S. Congress presenting and defending his side of his disagreement with Truman over the conduct of the Korean War. During his speech, he was interrupted by fifty ovations. MacArthur ended the address saying:

MacArthur received public adulation, which aroused expectations that he would run for president, but he was not a candidate. MacArthur carried out a speaking tour in 1951–52 attacking the Truman administration for "appeasement in Asia" and for mismanaging the economy. Initially attracting large crowds, by early 1952 MacArthur's speeches were attracting smaller and smaller numbers of people as many complained that MacArthur seemed more interested in settling scores with Truman and praising himself than in offering up a constructive vision for the nation. MacArthur felt uncomfortable campaigning for the Republican nomination, and hoped that at the 1952 Republican National Convention, a deadlock would ensue between Senator Robert A. Taft and General Dwight Eisenhower for the presidential nomination. MacArthur's plan was to then step in and offer himself as a compromise candidate; potentially picking Taft as a running mate. His unwillingness to campaign for the nomination seriously hurt his viability as a candidate however. In the end, MacArthur endorsed Taft and was keynote speaker at the convention. Taft ultimately lost the nomination to Eisenhower, who went on to win the general election in a landslide. Once elected, Eisenhower consulted with MacArthur, his former commanding officer, about ending the war in Korea.

Douglas and Jean MacArthur spent their last years together in the penthouse of the Waldorf Towers, a part of the Waldorf-Astoria Hotel. He was elected chairman of the board of Remington Rand. In that year, he earned a salary of $68,000 (equivalent to $612,000 in 2016), as well as $20,000 pay and allowances as a General of the Army. The Waldorf became the setting for an annual birthday party on 26 January thrown by the general's former deputy chief engineer, Major General Leif J. Sverdrup. At the 1960 celebration for MacArthur's 80th birthday, many of his friends were startled by the general's obviously deteriorating health. The next day, he collapsed and was rushed into surgery at St. Luke's Hospital to control a severely swollen prostate. In June 1960, he was decorated by the Japanese government with the Grand Cordon of the Order of the Rising Sun with Paulownia Flowers, the highest Japanese order which may be conferred on an individual who is not a head of state. In his statement upon receiving the honor, MacArthur said:

After his recovery, MacArthur methodically began to prepare for his death. He visited the White House for a final reunion with Eisenhower. In 1961, to commemorate the fifteenth anniversary of Filipino independence, an eighty-one year old MacArthur made a "sentimental journey" to the Philippines, where he was decorated by President Carlos P. Garcia with the Philippine Legion of Honor and met with cheering crowds. MacArthur also accepted a $900,000 (equivalent to $7.25 million in 2016) advance from Henry Luce for the rights to his memoirs, and wrote the volume that would eventually be published as Reminiscences. Sections began to appear in serialized form in Life magazine in the months before his death.

President John F. Kennedy solicited MacArthur's counsel in 1961 and 1962. The first of three meetings was held shortly after the Bay of Pigs invasion. MacArthur was extremely critical of the military advice given to Kennedy, and cautioned the young president to avoid a U.S. military build-up in Vietnam, pointing out that domestic problems should be given a much greater priority. MacArthur later gave similar advice to President Lyndon B. Johnson. In August 1962 Kennedy summoned MacArthur for counsel at the White House while MacArthur met members of Congress in Washington after Kennedy received intelligence that the Soviets were preparing to transport nuclear weapons to Cuba. “The greatest weapon of war is the blockade,” MacArthur advised Kennedy after a long conversation about how to deal with the Soviets and Chinese. “If war comes, that is the weapon we should use.” Kennedy used the naval blockade option during the Cuban Missile Crisis two months later thanks to MacArthur's advice. Kennedy heavily trusted MacArthur because whenever he was urged to increase U.S. involvement in Laos and Vietnam by generals, politicians, and advisors he would tell them, “Well now, you gentlemen, you go back and convince General MacArthur, then I’ll be convinced.”

In 1962, West Point honored the increasingly frail MacArthur with the Sylvanus Thayer Award for outstanding service to the nation, which had gone to Eisenhower the year before. MacArthur's speech to the cadets in accepting the award had as its theme "Duty, Honor, Country": 

In August 1962, MacArthur returned to Washington, D.C. to receive a special honor from a joint session of Congress called the Thanks of Congress. Congress unanimously passed a special resolution to give him this award. This was his first trip to Congress since April 1951 after he was relieved. He received an engrossed copy of the resolution that honored him for his military leadership during and following World War II and also "for his many years of effort to strengthen the ties between the Philippines and the United States.". This honor is unique in that it dates back to the American Revolutionary War and has rarely been given to anybody after the Civil War. Two months later MacArthur was awarded the Congressional Gold Medal that honored his "gallant service to his country".

In 1963, President Kennedy asked MacArthur to help mediate a dispute between the National Collegiate Athletic Association and the Amateur Athletic Union over control of amateur sports in the country. The dispute threatened to derail the participation of the United States in the 1964 Summer Olympics. His presence helped to broker a deal, and participation in the games went on as planned.

Death and legacy

Douglas MacArthur died at Walter Reed Army Medical Center on 5 April 1964, of biliary cirrhosis. Kennedy had authorized a state funeral before his own death in 1963, and Johnson confirmed the directive, ordering that MacArthur be buried "with all the honor a grateful nation can bestow on a departed hero". On 7 April his body was taken to New York City, where it lay in an open casket at the Seventh Regiment Armory for about 12 hours. That night it was taken on a funeral train to Union Station and transported by a funeral procession to the Capitol, where it lay in state at the United States Capitol rotunda. An estimated 150,000 people filed by the bier.

MacArthur had requested to be buried in Norfolk, where his mother had been born and where his parents had married. Accordingly, on 11 April, his funeral service was held in St Paul's Episcopal Church in Norfolk and his body was finally laid to rest in the rotunda of the Douglas MacArthur Memorial (the former Norfolk City Hall and later courthouse).

In 1960, the mayor of Norfolk had proposed using funds raised by public contribution to remodel the old Norfolk City Hall as a memorial to General MacArthur and as a repository for his papers, decorations, and mementos he had accepted. Restored and remodeled, the MacArthur Memorial contains nine museum galleries whose contents reflect the general's 50 years of military service. At the heart of the memorial is a rotunda. In its center lies a sunken circular crypt with two marble sarcophagi, one for MacArthur, the other for Jean, who continued to live in the Waldorf Towers until her own death in 2000.

The MacArthur Chambers in Brisbane, Australia, hosts the MacArthur Museum on the 8th floor where MacArthur had his office.

The majority of South Koreans consider MacArthur to be a hero who saved the country twice: once in 1945 and once in 1950. The city of Incheon erected a statue of MacArthur in 1957, which is considered a symbol of patriotism.

The Dai-Ichi Seimei Building has preserved MacArthur's 6th floor office as it was from 1945 to 1951 during his tenure as Supreme Commander for the Allied Powers.

MacArthur has a contested legacy. In the Philippines in 1942, he suffered a defeat that Gavin Long described as "the greatest in the history of American foreign wars". Despite this, "in a fragile period of the American psyche when the general American public, still stunned by the shock of Pearl Harbor and uncertain what lay ahead in Europe, desperately needed a hero, they wholeheartedly embraced Douglas MacArthur—good press copy that he was. There simply were no other choices that came close to matching his mystique, not to mention his evocative lone-wolf stand—something that has always resonated with Americans." He is highly respected and remembered to the present day in the Philippines and Japan. In 1961 MacArthur traveled to Manila, Philippines one final time and was greeted by a cheering crowd of two million.

MacArthur's concept of the role of the soldier as encompassing a broad spectrum of roles that included civil affairs, quelling riots and low-level conflict, was dismissed by the majority of officers who had fought in Europe during World War II, and afterwards saw the Army's role as fighting the Soviet Union. Unlike them, in his victories in New Guinea in 1944, the Philippines in 1945 and Korea in 1950, he fought outnumbered, and relied on maneuver and surprise for success. The American Sinologist John King Fairbank called MacArthur "our greatest soldier".

On the other hand, Truman once remarked that he did not understand how the U.S. Army could "produce men such as Robert E. Lee, John J. Pershing, Eisenhower and Bradley and at the same time produce Custers, Pattons and MacArthur". His relief of MacArthur cast a long shadow over American civil-military relations for decades. When Lyndon Johnson met with William Westmoreland in Honolulu in 1966, he told him: "General, I have a lot riding on you. I hope you don't pull a MacArthur on me." MacArthur's relief "left a lasting current of popular sentiment that in matters of war and peace, the military really knows best", a philosophy which became known as "MacArthurism".

MacArthur remains a controversial and enigmatic figure. He has been portrayed as a reactionary, although he was in many respects ahead of his time. He championed a progressive approach to the reconstruction of Japanese society, arguing that all occupations ultimately ended badly for the occupier and the occupied. He was often out of step with his contemporaries, such as in 1941 when he contended that Nazi Germany could not defeat the Soviet Union, when he argued that North Korea and China were no mere Soviet puppets, and throughout his career in his insistence that the future lay in the Far East. As such, MacArthur implicitly rejected White American contemporary notions of their own racial superiority. He always treated Filipino and Japanese leaders with respect as equals. At the same time, his Victorian sensibilities recoiled at leveling Manila with aerial bombing, an attitude the hardened World War II generation regarded as old fashioned. When asked about MacArthur, Blamey once said, "The best and the worst things you hear about him are both true."

MacArthur was quoted by Justice Betty Ellerin of the Appellate Division of the Supreme Court of the State of New York, First Department in the 23 July 1987 decision on the case "Dallas Parks, Respondent, v. George Steinbrenner et al., Appellants." The quote used was about him being "proud to have protected American freedoms, like the freedom to boo the umpire".

Honors and awards

During his lifetime, MacArthur earned over 100 military decorations from the U.S. and other countries including the Medal of Honor, the French Légion d'honneur and Croix de guerre, the Order of the Crown of Italy, the Order of Orange-Nassau from the Netherlands, the Honorary Knight Grand Cross of the Order of the Bath  from Australia, and the Order of the Rising Sun with Paulownia Flowers, Grand Cordon from Japan.

MacArthur was enormously popular with the American public. Streets, public works, and children were named after him. A dance step was even named after him. A 1961 Time article said that "to Filipinos, MacArthur [was] a hero without flaw" and he was met with cheering crowds of around two million when he visited the Philippines a final time that year. In 1955, his promotion to General of the Armies was proposed in Congress, but the proposal was shelved.

Since 1987 the General Douglas MacArthur Leadership Awards are presented annually by the United States Army on behalf of the General Douglas MacArthur Foundation to recognize company grade officers (lieutenants and captains) and junior warrant officers (warrant officer one and chief warrant officer two) who have demonstrated the attributes of "duty, honor, country" in their professional lives and in service to their communities. Each awardee is presented with a 15-pound bronze bust of the general.

The General Douglas MacArthur Foundation presents the MacArthur Cadet Awards in recognition of outstanding cadets within the Association of Military Colleges and Schools of the United States. The MacArthur Award is presented annually to seniors at these military schools. The award is designed to encourage cadets to emulate the leadership qualities shown by General Douglas MacArthur, as a student at West Texas Military Institute and the U.S. Military Academy. Approximately 40 schools are authorized to provide the award to its top cadet each year.

Since 1989 the U.S. Army Cadet Command on behalf of the General Douglas MacArthur Foundation annually presents the MacArthur Award to the 8 best U.S. Army ROTC programs in the country out of 274 senior Army ROTC units. The award is based on a combination of the performance by the school and its ROTC's commanding officers to support the program, its cadets' performance and standing on the command's National Order of Merit List, and its cadet retention rate.

The MacArthur Leadership Award at the Royal Military College of Canada in Kingston, Ontario, is awarded to the graduating officer cadet who demonstrates outstanding leadership performance based on the credo of Duty-Honor-Country and potential for future military service.

Portrayals
Several actors have portrayed MacArthur on screen.
 Dayton Lummis in The Court-Martial of Billy Mitchell (1955)
 Henry Fonda in the television movie Collision Course: Truman vs. MacArthur (1976)
 Gregory Peck in MacArthur (1977)
 Laurence Olivier in Inchon (1981)
 John Bennett Perry in Farewell to the King (1989)
 James B. Sikking in In Pursuit of Honor (1995)
 Daniel von Bargen in Truman (1995)
 Robert Dawson in The Sun (2005)
 Tommy Lee Jones in Emperor (2012)
 Liam Neeson in Operation Chromite (2016)
 Michael Ironside in Tokyo Trial (2016)
 Miguel Faustmann in Quezon's Game (2018)

Dates of rank

In 1955, legislation was in the early stages of consideration by the United States Congress which would have authorized the President of the United States to promote Douglas MacArthur to the rank of General of the Armies. A similar measure had also been proposed unsuccessfully by Stuart Symington in 1945. However, because of several complications which would arise if such a promotion were to take place, the bill was withdrawn.

Bibliography

Notes

References

Further reading

 
 
 Briggs, Philip J. "General MacArthur and the Presidential Election of 1944." Presidential Studies Quarterly (1992): 31-46. online

External links
 
 
 
 
 
 
 
 
 
 Truman Fires MacArthur, Aftermath: Original Letters 
 Senate joint resolution to authorize the appointment of General of the Army Douglas MacArthur as General of the Armies of the United States
 
 FBI file on General Douglas MacArthur at vault.fbi.gov
 
 
 
 Generals of World War II

|-

|-

|-

|-

|-

 
1880 births
1964 deaths
American Episcopalians
American anti-communists
American expatriates in Japan
American expatriates in the Philippines
American five-star officers
American military engineers
American people of Scottish descent
American Presbyterians
Burials in Virginia
Candidates in the 1944 United States presidential election
Candidates in the 1948 United States presidential election
Candidates in the 1952 United States presidential election
Chief Commanders of the Philippine Legion of Honor
Congressional Gold Medal recipients
Deaths from autoimmune disease
Deaths from cirrhosis
Deaths from kidney failure
Field marshals
Grand Croix of the Légion d'honneur
Grand Crosses of the Order of Polonia Restituta
Grand Crosses of the Order of the Crown (Belgium)
Honorary Knights Grand Cross of the Order of the Bath
Knights Grand Cross of the Order of Orange-Nassau
Douglas
Military history of the Philippines
Military personnel from Little Rock, Arkansas
Military personnel of the Cold War
New York (state) Republicans
People from Manhattan
Presidents of the United States Olympic Committee
Recipients of the Air Medal
Recipients of the Croix de Guerre 1914–1918 (France)
Recipients of the Distinguished Flying Cross (United States)
Recipients of the Distinguished Service Cross (United States)
Recipients of the Distinguished Service Medal (US Army)
Recipients of the Navy Distinguished Service Medal
Recipients of the Order of Military Merit (Korea)
Recipients of the Order of the Rising Sun with Paulownia Flowers
Recipients of the Order of the Sacred Tripod
Recipients of the Order of the White Lion
Recipients of the Silver Star
Recipients of the War Merit Cross (Italy)
Sons of the American Revolution
Superintendents of the United States Military Academy
TMI Episcopal alumni
United States Army Chiefs of Staff
United States Army Command and General Staff College alumni
United States Army Corps of Engineers personnel
United States Army generals of World War I
United States Army generals of World War II
United States Army generals
United States Army Medal of Honor recipients
United States Army personnel of the Korean War
United States Military Academy alumni
United States military governors
World War II recipients of the Medal of Honor